Carlia munda, the shaded-litter rainbow-skink, is a species of skink in the genus Carlia. It is endemic to northern Australia.

References

Carlia
Reptiles described in 1885
Endemic fauna of Australia
Skinks of Australia
Taxa named by Charles Walter De Vis